WONS may refer to:

 Warrant Officer of the Naval Service, Senior Rating of the British Naval Service
 WQRS, a radio station (98.3 FM) licensed to Cannonsburg, Kentucky, United States, which held the call sign WONS from 2015 to 2018
 WVTT-CD, a low-power television station (channel 25) licensed to Olean, New York, United States, which held the call sign WONS-LP from 1999 to 2012

See also